Squads for the Football at the 1978 Asian Games played in Bangkok, Thailand.

Group A

Head coach:  Nian Weisi

Head coach:  Ammo Baba

Head coach:

Head coach:  David Woodfield

Group B

Head coach:

Head coach:  Pak Du-Sok

Head coach:  Peter Schnittger

Group C

Head coach:  Werner Bickelhaupt

Head coach:  Arun Ghosh

Head coach:  Chow Kwai Lam

Group D

Head coach:  Jack Mansell

Head coach:  Hiroshi Ninomiya

Head coach:  Ham Heung-chul

Head coach:  Mario Zagallo

References

External links
https://web.archive.org/web/20140102232311/http://rdfc.com.ne.kr/int/skor-intres-1970.html

1978
1978